The California Writers Club traces its founding to the San Francisco Bay Area literary movement in the early part of the 20th century. The informal gatherings of Jack London, George Sterling, and Herman Whitaker, along with others, eventually became formalized as the Press Club of Alameda. In 1909, a break-off group from that club formed the California Writers Club with Austin Lewis serving as the club's first president. A quarterly bulletin under the guidance of Dr. William S. Morgan was established in 1912. The club finally incorporated in 1913, choosing the motto Sail On from the Joaquin Miller poem, "Columbus".

The general purposes of the California Writers Club are to provide a forum for literary criticism and for recognition of achievement, to discover new authors and assist them in developing their talent, and to sponsor educational meetings to promote professional growth.

History
Early members of the club included Jack London, George Sterling, John Muir, Joaquin Miller, and the first California poet laureate, Ina Coolbrith.

In 1914, the first edition of West Winds, a hardcover collection of fiction by members, was published. It was illustrated by local California artists. Since that time three other West Winds have been published.

The California Writers Club organized literary events in the prewar period; the first California Writers Club Conference was held in Oakland in 1941. The California Writers Club also organized social events with a literary orientation.

Notable Members
 Hester A. Benedict
 Winifred Davidson
 Belle Willey Gue
Stella Wynne Herron
 Vingie E. Roe
 Geneve L. A. Shaffer

Present day
Today, writers conferences are held by several of the Club's branches, such as South Bay's East of Eden Writers Conference, San Francisco/Peninsula's Jack London Writers Conference, and San Fernando Valley's conferences.  Each attracts from 100 to 400 writers and dozens of literary agents, editors, authors, and publishers from all over the United States to present lectures, workshops, and panel discussions on all aspects of the writing life.

Writers Memorial Grove at Joaquin Miller Park in Oakland celebrates California's great writers with the planting of trees. The first tree was planted for Joaquin Miller. Bret Harte, Charles Warren Stoddard, Edward Rowland Sill, Ina Coolbrith, Jack London, Mark Twain, Charles Fletcher Lummis, and Edwin Markham are so honored as well as Dashiell Hammett, Gertrude Stein, and historians, Will Durant and Ariel Durant.

In 2003, the California Writers Club worked to establish a week to celebrate and recognize California Writers. The result of this effort occurred on September 4, 2003 when the California State Assembly officially declared the third week in October of each year as California Writers Week (Members Resolution No. 2170). The Resolution is endorsed by the California Library Association.

Every other year, each branch selects one member to receive a Jack London Service Award in recognition of their contributions to the Club.

Today, the California Writers Club has more than 1,800 members in 19 branches spread throughout California.

References 

Clubs and societies in California
.
Organizations based in the San Francisco Bay Area
Organizations established in 1912
1912 establishments in California